Davazdah Emam (also Romanized as Davāzdah Emām) is a village in Qaleh Shahin Rural District, in the Central District of Sarpol-e Zahab County, Kermanshah Province, Iran. At the 2006 census, its population was 285, in 62 families.

References 

Populated places in Sarpol-e Zahab County